Correa lawrenceana var.  lawrenceana is the implicit autonym of Correa lawrenceana and is endemic to Tasmania. It is a shrub with papery, oblong leaves and pale green, narrow cylindrical flowers arranged singly on the ends of branchlets.

Description
Specimens in the north-east of the state have narrow leaves, while those from the south and west have wider leaves with hairy undersides. Flowering mostly occurs in spring.

Taxonomy
Correa lawrenceana was first formally described in 1834 by William Jackson Hooker who published the description in his journal, The Journal of Botany. In 1855, his son Joseph Dalton Hooker described Correa lawrenceana var. glabra, implicitly creating the autonym C. lawrenceana var. lawrenceana.

Distribution and habitat
This variety of C. lawrenceana grows in forest, mainly in mountainous areas in Tasmania, including on King Island. The variety is also listed as occurring in the Australian Capital Territory.

References

lawrenciana lawrenceana
Flora of Tasmania
Flora of the Australian Capital Territory
Taxa named by Joseph Dalton Hooker
Plants described in 1855